Robert Fuchs (11 May 1895 – 15 January 1977) was a German general during World War II who commanded the 1st Air Division. He was a recipient of the Knight's Cross of the Iron Cross.

Awards and decorations

 Knight's Cross of the Iron Cross on 6 April 1940 as Oberst and Geschwaderkommodore of Kampfgeschwader 26

References

Citations

Bibliography

 
 
 

1895 births
1977 deaths
Military personnel from Berlin
People from the Province of Brandenburg
German Army personnel of World War I
Luftwaffe World War II generals
Recipients of the clasp to the Iron Cross, 1st class
Recipients of the Knight's Cross of the Iron Cross
Reichswehr personnel
Major generals of the Luftwaffe